A  is a sweet or savory casserole made of groats (wheat, buckwheat, barley or rice) and , or Russian farmer cheese. It is a dish that is typical for Russian cuisine.

First, cook a crumbly porridge and let it cool, then add tvorog, sugar and raw eggs to it (also using butter or margarine, sour cream / smetana). The well-mixed mass is spread in an even layer in a saucepan, baking sheet or frying pan, previously oiled. Grease the top of the casserole with butter or a mixture of eggs and sour cream and bake in the oven.

See also
 List of casserole dishes
 List of Russian dishes

Sources 
 
 Сладкий крупеник из гречки / Sweet krupenik from buckwheat (rus.)
Russian cuisine
Casserole dishes